This article lists the companies worldwide engaged in the development of quantum computing or quantum communication. Quantum computing and communication are two sub-fields of quantum information science, which describes and theorizes information science in terms of quantum physics. While the fundamental unit of classical information is the bit, the basic unit of quantum information is the qubit.

Company details

See also
Quantum programming
Quantum supremacy
List of quantum processors

References

Further reading 
Quantum Computing Report's list of quantum players
The Quantum Insider's list of quantum computing companies

Companies
Lists of technology companies
Companies involved in quantum computing